RU-28362 is a synthetic androstane glucocorticoid that was developed by Roussel Uclaf. It is a selective agonist of the glucocorticoid receptor (corticoid type II receptor), but not of the mineralocorticoid receptor (corticoid type I receptor).

A similar compound is dexamethasone that also selectively binds to the glucocorticoid receptor with high affinity. This is in contrast to the natural steroid hormones cortisol or corticosterone, which bind to both of the corticosteroid receptors, though they bind to the mineralocorticoid receptor with greater affinity.

See also
 Fluoxymesterone

References

Androstanes
Glucocorticoids